Kryve Ozero Raion was a subdivision of Mykolaiv Oblast of Ukraine. Its administrative center was the urban-type settlement of Kryve Ozero. The raion was abolished on 18 July 2020 as part of the administrative reform of Ukraine, which reduced the number of raions of Mykolaiv Oblast to four. The area of Kryve Ozero Raion was merged into Pervomaisk Raion. The last estimate of the raion population was

History
In the 1920s, the current area of the district belonged to Odessa Governorate. In 1923, uyezds in Ukrainian Soviet Socialist Republic were abolished, and the governorates were divided into okruhas. In 1923, Kryve Ozero Raion with the administrative center in Kryve Ozero was established. It belonged to Pervomaisk Okruha. In 1925, the governorates were abolished, and okruhas were directly subordinated to Ukrainian SSR. In 1930, okruhas were abolished, and on 27 February 1932, Odessa Oblast was established, and Kryve Ozero was included into Odessa Oblast. In February 1954, Kryve Ozero Raion was transferred to Mykolaiv Oblast.

At the time of disestablishment, the raion consisted of one hromada, Kryve Ozero settlement hromada with the administration in Kryve Ozero.

References

Former raions of Mykolaiv Oblast
States and territories established in 1923
1923 establishments in Ukraine
Ukrainian raions abolished during the 2020 administrative reform